Fiorenza Liza Elly Purnamasari (born March 27, 1991) is an Indonesian presenter, model and beauty pageant titleholder who was crowned Puteri Indonesia Lingkungan 2011 and represented her country at the Miss International 2012 pageant.

Personal life
Liza was born in Malang, East Java - Indonesia, she holds a bachelor degree in Marketing communications at STIKOM The London School of Public Relations in Jakarta. She is a presenter on Television Program in Indonesia. In 2012 she married with Indonesian actor Nicky Tirta, and later divorced in 2018.

Pageantry

Miss Indonesia Earth 2010
Liza won the title of Miss Indonesia Earth in 2010. She was an official Indonesian representative at the Miss Earth 2010, but she withdrew due unknown and unclear reasons by Miss Indonesia Earth Foundation. She was replaced by her runner-up, Jesicca Aurellia Tji a few days before Miss Earth 2010 held in Nha Trang, Vietnam.

Puteri Indonesia 2011
Liza competed on Puteri Indonesia 2011 as the representative of East Java. She won the title of Puteri Indonesia Lingkungan 2011 title. Liza and the other 37 contestants from 33 provinces competed for the title, she is the first woman from East Java to win the Puteri Indonesia Lingkungan title.

Miss International 2012
Liza competed at the Miss International 2012 in Okinawa, Japan. She unplaced the competition.

Filmography
Liza has presenting on her own several variety TV talk show.

Talk show

See also

 Puteri Indonesia 2011
 Miss International 2012
 Maria Selena Nurcahya
 Andi Tenri Gusti Hanum Utari Natassa

References

External links
 
 Official Puteri Indonesia Official Website
 Miss International Official Website

Living people
1991 births
Indonesian Christians
Indonesian beauty pageant winners
Puteri Indonesia winners
Miss International 2012 delegates